Gur-e Gavarz (also Romanized as Gūr-e Gāvarz) is a village in Qalkhani Rural District, Gahvareh District, Dalahu County, Kermanshah Province, Iran. At the 2006 census, its population was 159, in 40 families.

References 

Populated places in Dalahu County